This is a list of people with Down syndrome, a condition also known as Down's syndrome or trisomy 21. Down syndrome is a genetic disorder caused by the presence of all or part of a third copy of chromosome 21. It is typically associated with physical growth delays, characteristic facial features, and mild to moderate intellectual disability. The average IQ of a young adult with Down syndrome is 50, equivalent to the mental age of an 8- or 9-year-old child, but this number varies widely. Down syndrome is the most common chromosome abnormality in humans, occurring in about one per 1000 babies born each year.

A–Z

References

Down